Olivier Sanou (born July 2, 1975) is a retired Burkinan track and field athlete. He was a high jumper before specializing in the triple jump in the late 1990s. A double African champion, Sanou made his mark in Africa. He competed at the 2004 Summer Olympics, but failed to qualify for the final.

Competition record

Personal bests
 High jump - 2.15 m (1997) – national record is 2.22 m
 Long jump - 7.48 m (2002) – national record is 8.00 m
 Triple jump - 16.91 m (2003) – national record

References

External links
 

1975 births
Living people
Burkinabé male triple jumpers
Burkinabé male high jumpers
Burkinabé long jumpers
Male long jumpers
Olympic athletes of Burkina Faso
Athletes (track and field) at the 1996 Summer Olympics
Athletes (track and field) at the 2004 Summer Olympics
African Games bronze medalists for Burkina Faso
African Games medalists in athletics (track and field)
Athletes (track and field) at the 1999 All-Africa Games
Athletes (track and field) at the 2003 All-Africa Games
World Athletics Championships athletes for Burkina Faso
21st-century Burkinabé people